Joseph Slotnick (born October 2, 1968) is an American film actor and voice actor. He is known for roles in Twister (1996), Hollow Man (2000), Elevator (2011), The Single Guy (1995–1997), and Nip/Tuck (2003-2006).

Life and career
Slotnick was born in Chicago, Illinois and graduated from Chaparral High School in Las Vegas, Nevada. His film roles include computer industry pioneer Steve Wozniak in the film Pirates of Silicon Valley, and a part in the 1996 blockbuster Twister.  In 2011 he completed the suspense film Elevator, in which he plays one of several people trapped in a New York elevator with an evil presence. Additionally, he was on the cast of the television shows Boston Public in 2000–2001, The Single Guy from 1995–1997, and Nip/Tuck from 2003–2006.

In 2009, Slotnick played Groucho Marx's role of Captain Jeffrey Spaulding in The Goodman Theatre's production of Animal Crackers.  The performance was nominated for a Joseph Jefferson Award for best actor.

Slotnick has logged several guest appearances on a number of popular television shows.  He also does commercial work, ads for the NBA, 21st Century Insurance, Staples and Verizon Fios.

Slotnick is Jewish.

Partial filmography

A League of Their Own (1992) - Doris's Fan #2
Beverly Hills, 90210 (1995, TV Series) - Tuck
The Single Guy (1995–1997, TV Series) - Sam Sloan / Mark Sloan
Twister (1996) - Joey
The Nanny (1997, TV Series) - Brian Levine
Dinner and Driving (1997) - Jason
Since You've Been Gone (1998, TV Movie) - Zane Levy
Judas Kiss (1998) - Walters
Blast from the Past (1999) - Soda Jerk
Idle Hands (1999) - Burger Jungle Manager
Pirates of Silicon Valley (1999, TV Movie) - Steve Wozniak
Family Guy (1999-2006, TV Series) - Jewish Man / Angry Man / Bob / Bob / Carter (voice)
Hollow Man (2000) - Frank Chase
Boston Public (2000–2001, TV Series) - Milton Buttle
Alias (2002, TV Series) - Steven Haladki
CSI: Crime Scene Investigation (2003, TV Series) - Marty Gibson
Nip/Tuck (2003–2006, TV Series) - Dr. Merril Bobolit
Curb Your Enthusiasm (2004, TV Series) - Marvin
Entourage (2004, TV Series) - Waiter
Medium (2005, TV Series) - Brett Carter
Ghost Whisperer (2005, TV Series) - Cliff Aimes
Law and Order SVU (2006, TV Series) - Walter Camp
I Want Someone to Eat Cheese With (2006) - Larry
Boston Legal (2007, TV Series) - Simon Griffin
Brief Interviews with Hideous Men (2008) - Tad / Subject #59
Pushing Daisies (2009, TV Series) - Jimmy Neptune
The Office (2010, TV Series) - Jerry
Made in Romania (2010) - Ronald Krapner
Too Big to Fail (2011, TV Movie) - Dan Jester
Elevator (2012) - George Axelrod
The Dictator (2012) - Homeless Man
Tuna (2013) - Wes
Psych (2013, TV Series) - Leo Quinn
The Secret Life of Walter Mitty (2013) - Retirement Home Administrator
The Cobbler (2014) - Mr. Slick
Blue Bloods (2016, TV Series) - Show Writer Klein
Humor Me (2018) - Zimmerman
The Goldfinch (2019) - Dave (Theo's Psychiatrist)
Plane (2023) - Sinclair

Stage
Broadway
The Big Knife (2013)
The Front Page (2016-2017)
Junk (2017-2018)

References

External links

 Joey Slotnick on The Interview Show

1968 births
Living people
American male film actors
American male television actors
American male voice actors
Male actors from Chicago
People from the Las Vegas Valley
Southern Methodist University alumni
20th-century American male actors
21st-century American male actors
Male actors from Nevada
Jewish American male actors
21st-century American Jews